Knallen Peak is a small rock peak  west of Pyramiden Nunatak, at the east side of the head of Schytt Glacier in Queen Maud Land, Antarctica. It was mapped by Norwegian cartographers from surveys and air photos by the Norwegian–British–Swedish Antarctic Expedition (1949–52) and named Knallen.

References

Mountains of Queen Maud Land
Princess Martha Coast